Sharanjit Singh Dhillion (born 18 April 1953) is a member of the Punjab Legislative Assembly. He represents the Sahnewal, Ludhiana constituency of Punjab and was irrigation minister in ruling SAD-BJP government of Punjab from 2012 to 2017.

Personal life
Dhillon was born to Mohinder Singh and Jaswant Kaur on 18 April 1953 in Bhagpur village of Ludhiana district in Punjab. He received his Bachelor of Arts and Bachelor of Laws degree educated at Panjab University, Chandigarh and Punjabi University, Patiala. Dhillon married Pawandeep Kaur on 31 January 1982, with whom he has a son and a daughter.

References

Living people
1953 births
Indian Sikhs
India MPs 2004–2009
People from Ludhiana district
Shiromani Akali Dal politicians
Punjab, India MLAs 2012–2017
Lok Sabha members from Punjab, India
India MPs 1984–1989
Politicians from Ludhiana
Punjab, India MLAs 2017–2022